Esprit-Marie-Joseph Florens (June 4, 1762 – March 30, 1834) was the Vicar Apostolic of Siam.

Biography
Esprit-Marie-Joseph Florens was born in Lagnes, France on 4 Jun 1762. in 1786, he was ordained a priest in the La Société des Missions Etrangères dedicated to missionary work.

On June 29, 1810, Pope Pius VII was named as Titular Bishop of Sozopolis in Haemimonto and appointed him as Coadjutor Vicar Apostolic of Siam. On March 4, 1811, he succeeded Arnaud-Antoine Garnault. He was consecrated bishop on April 12, 1812, by Bishop Jean Labartette, Vicar Apostolic of Cochin.

Episcopal succession
While bishop, he was the principal consecrator of:
Barthélemy Bruguière, Titular Bishop of Capsus (1829); and
Jean-Louis Taberd, Titular Bishop of Isauropolis (1830).

References

1762 births
1834 deaths
Bishops appointed by Pope Pius VII
French expatriates in Thailand
Apostolic vicars of Siam
Paris Foreign Missions Society bishops